Tomasz Urbanowicz (born 1959 in Wrocław, Poland) is an architect and a designer of architectural glass art.

Biography 
Tomasz Urbanowicz graduated at the Faculty of Architecture of the Wrocław University of Technology (1978–85). He took glass-window studies at the Fine Arts Academy of Nicolaus Copernicus University in Toruń, Poland (1982–85) and worked as an assistant in the Painting and Sculpture Establishment at the Architecture Department of Wrocław Institute. In 1987, together with his wife, architect Beata Urbanowicz, he established his own studio, Archiglass, focused on creating architectural glass art. In 2016, Tomasz Urbanowicz was awarded the Honorable Graduate Award by Wrocław University of Technology.

His glassworks were featured in 'Colours of Architecture' by Andrew Moor (London, 2006), 'Contemporary Kiln-formed Glass' by Keith Cummings ( London / Philadelphia 2009) and 'Szkło we Współczesnej Architekturze' by Ewa Wala.

Urbanowicz's artworks took part in World Fairs EXPO three times representing Poland; at EXPO 2000 in Hanover, Germany - as part of the presentation of Lower Silesia; at EXPO 2005 in Aichi, Japan, where his glass composition ‘the Soul of the Piano’ was the main artefact in the Polish Pavilion, designed by prof. Krzysztof Ingarden, and at EXPO 2008 in Zaragoza, Spain, where his composition ‘Poland - Wind in the Sails’ was part of the national presentation.

Architectural glass art composition by Tomasz Urbanowicz can also be found in many places around the world: the glass orb ‘The United Earth’ is a central artistic element on European Parliament building agora in Strasbourg, France; the glass rainbow ‘Larc en ciel’ decorates G. Brassens College in Paris, France; green glass castings enlight the lobby of the Holsten Brewery Headquarters in Hamburg, Germany; and the composition ‘Blue Sunset in the Ocean’ cruises around the world on one of the world's biggest ocean liners Queen Mary 2.

One of the artist's works is a complex architectural glass composition with diverse musical notations in the foyer of the newly built Podlasie Opera and Philharmonic building in Białystok, Poland.

In 2014, Urbanowicz's glass art works from the 'GlassHenge' series were exhibited at the Wrocław Airport.

In the years 2018-2019 Tomasz Urbanowicz together with prof. Przemysław Tyszkiewicz developed a new own technique to consolidate graphics in glass art. They created several joint works called 'Corsydians' series, exhibited among others at the collective exhibition "Para.Ceramics.Prints' in Oblastni galerie in Liberec or the collective exhibition "Robinson's Ship" organized by the City Gallery and Museum of Architecture in Wrocław.

The latest realizations of large-scale architectural glass art, made by Tomasz Urbanowicz in cooperation with his son, arch. Konrad Urbanowicz, include the composition "The Spirit of Health" at the Integrative Medical Center Clinic in Żerniki Wrocławskie and the glass art EGG - concierge desk in the baroque interior of the historic Main Building of the University of Wrocław.

Selected projects 

 2019 - Glass Art EGG, Concierge Desk, Main Building, University of Wrocław
 2018 - 'The Spirit of Health', Glass Compositions, IMC Integrative Medical Center Clinic, Żerniki Wrocławskie
 2015 - Artistic Glass Panels in Main Hall and Chapel, T. Marciniak Lower Silesian Specialist Hospital, Wrocław
 2015 - Glass Waterfalls Facade, Ultranet Office Building, Wrocław
 2015 - Artistic Glasing, Senate Hall, University of Economics in Katowice
 2014 - Artistic Glass Balustrade, 'ODRA' European Cooperation Center, Oława
 2013 - Glass Sculpture 'Big Bang', Campus of the University in Białystok
 2012 - Architectural Glass Art – columns, capitals, walls, panels - interior & exterior, Podlasie Opera and Philharmonic, Białystok
 2011 - 'Baroque glasses', Main Building, University of Wrocław
 2011 - Glass & Stone Compositions, Muzeum Karkonoskie, Jelenia Góra
 2010 - 'Silver Meteorites', Glass & Stone Compositions, Optical fiber backlit, Swimming Pool, Srebrna Góra
 2010 - 'Catamaran Sails', Glass Compositions, Optical fiber backlit, Swimming Pool in 'Catamaran House', Chyby
 2010 - Artistic Glass Panels, Słoneczne Termy, Wielka Pieniawa, Polanica Zdrój
 2010 - First Psalm on Curved Artistic Glasses, Church St. Józef, Przedbórz
 2010 - Glass Facade, Justin Center, Wrocław
 2010 - Architectural Glass Art Panels, Restaurant 'Pod Złotym Głogiem', Market Square, Głogów
 2008 - Glass Sculpture 'Wind in the Sails', EXPO 2008 Zaragoza, Spain
 2008 - 'Kudowater', A three-story-high Glass Art Composition, Sanatorium 'Zameczek', Kudowa Zdrój
 2008 - Architectural Glass Art Panels, Centuria Wellness & Spa Hotel, Ogrodzieniec
 2008 - Glass Art Cross and Artistic Glasing, Church of the Savior of the Evangelical-Augsburg Parish, Działdowo
 2008 - Parisian Motifs in Glass Art Panels, 'Bistro de Paris' Restaurant, Warsaw
 2006 - 'Angel', Polish Institute in Prague, Czech Republic
 2006 - Electric Glass Art Compositions, Science and Research Center, Faculty of Electrical Engineering, Wrocław University of Science and Technology
 2005 - Glass Sculpture 'The Soul of the Piano', EXPO 2005 Aichi, Japan
 2004 - Artistic Glass Panels, University's Chapel, Faculty of Theology, University of Silesia in Katowice
 2004 - Glass Sphere 'United Earth', European Parliament, Strasbourg, France
 2003 - Curved Glass Composition 'Blue Sunset in the Ocean', 10th Deck, Transatlantic RMS Queen Mary II
 2001 - Featured Glass Wall Composition, Museum of Architecture, Wrocław
 2000 - Architectural Glass Art, The Palace in Opypy
 2000 - Glass Compositions 'Brewing Process', Holsten Brewery, Hamburg, Germany
 2000 - 'Bear', Glass Sculpture, EXPO 2000 Hanover, Germany
 2000 - Glass & Brass Portal, 'Under the Blue Sun' Passage, Rynek, Wrocław
 1999 - Glass Eagle Compositions, Supreme Court, Warsaw
 1999 - 'Hope', Glass Art Cross, Evangelical-Augsburg Parish of God's Providence, Wrocław
 1996 - Silver-inspired Glass Composition, 'Muse' Cultural Center, Lubin
 1995 - Glass Rainbow Sculpture, Bank Pekao S.A., Lubin
 1993 - Glass Rainbow Composition, Collège Georges-Brassens, Paris, France

Selected national and international exhibitions 

 2019 - 'Robinsons's Ship', Collective Exhibition, The City Gallery and Museum of Architecture, Wrocław
 2018-2019 - 'Para.Ceramics.Graphics', The Eugeniusz Geppert Academy of Arts and Design Collective Exhibition (host/guest), Oblastni Galerie, Liberec, Czech Republic
 2018 - 'Long Night of Museums', Archiglass Gallery 'Szopa Jazowa', Wrocław
 2017-2018 - „Glasstosteron”, Collective Exhibition (Andrzej Kucharski, Marcin Litwa, Mariusz Łabiński, Wojciech Olech, Kazimierz Pawlak, Wojciech Peszko, Janusz Robaszewski, Czesław Roszkowski, Stanisław Sobota, Grzegorz Staniszewski, Tomasz Urbanowicz, Ryszard Więckowski, Igor Wójcik, Maciej Zaborski)
 Książ Castle, March - April 2017
 The City Art Gallery, Łódź, April – May 2017
 Glass Heritage Centre, Krosno, June – August 2017
 Glass and Ceramics Cenre, Cracow, September – November 2017
 WINDA Gallery of Contemporary Art, Kielce, January – February 2018
 2016 - 'Glass and Ceramics - Sensual Areas', European Capital of Culture, City Arsenal, Wrocław
 2016 - Glaskunst Exhibition, Cannenburgh Castle, Vaassen, Netherlands
 2016 - Festival dell' Arte, Wojanów Palace
 2014 - 'Painted with Glass', Contemporary Arts Gallery, Ostrów Wielkopolski
 2014 - 'GlassHenge', Wrocław Airport
 2014 - Festival dell' Arte, Pakoszów Palace
 2013 - Festival dell' Arte, Wojanów Palace
 2013 - Glaskunst Exhibition, Cannenburgh Castle, Vaassen, Netherlands
 2012 - Festival dell' Arte, Wojanów Palace
 2008 - EXPO Zaragoza, Glass Sculpture 'Wind in the Sails' in the Polish Pavilion, Spain
 2006 - 'Tomasz Urbanowicz, Szkło | Glass', The City Gallery 'Arsenal', Poznań
 2005 - EXPO 2005 Aichi, Glass Sculpture 'The Soul of the Piano' in the Polish Pavilion, Japan,
 2003 - Polish Embassy Gardens, Prague, Czech Republic
 2000 - EXPO 2000 Hanover, Germany
 1999 - 'URBANOWICZ-SZKŁO | -GLASS', Museum of Architecture, Wrocław

References

External links 
 Official website

Glass artists
Contemporary sculptors
Polish contemporary artists
Artists from Wrocław
Architects from Wrocław
Living people
1959 births